Thomas Watson (c. 1620–1686) was an English, Puritan preacher and author. He was ejected from his London parish after the Restoration, but continued to preach privately.

Education and career
He was educated at Emmanuel College, Cambridge, where he was noted for remarkably intense study. In 1646 he commenced a 16-year pastorate at St. Stephen's, Walbrook.

Watson showed strong Presbyterian views during the civil war, with, however, an attachment to the king, and in 1651 he was imprisoned briefly with some other ministers for his share in Christopher Love's plot to recall Charles II of England. He was released on 30 June 1652, and was formally reinstated as vicar of St. Stephen's Walbrook. He obtained great fame and popularity as a preacher until the Restoration, when he was ejected for Nonconformity. Notwithstanding the rigor of the acts against dissenters, Watson continued to exercise his ministry privately as he found opportunity.

Upon the Declaration of Indulgence in 1672 he obtained a licence to preach at the great hall in Crosby House. After preaching there for several years, his health gave way and he retired to Barnston, Essex, where he died suddenly, while praying in secret. He was buried on 28 July 1686.

Writing
Watson still has numerous titles available in print. His works include:
All Things for Good (originally published as A Divine Cordial) 
The Godly Man's Picture 
The Ten Commandments 
The Doctrine of Repentance 
Sermons of Thomas Watson (a compilation) 
A Plea for the Godly: And Other Sermons 
The Duty of Self-Denial: (And 10 Other Sermons) 
The Fight of Faith Crowned: The Remaining Sermons of Thomas Watson, Rector of St. Stephen's Walbrook, London 
The Beatitudes 
The Lord's Prayer 
The Lord's Supper 
The Art of Divine Contentment 
 
Jerusalem's Glory: A Puritan's View of the Church 
Heaven Taken by Storm: Showing the Holy Violence a Christian Is to Put Forth in the Pursuit After Glory 
The Mischief of Sin 
A Body of Divinity: Contained in Sermons upon the Westminster Assembly's Catechism  and 
Gleanings from Thomas Watson (a compilation) 
Harmless as Doves: A Puritan's view of the Christian Life 
The Great Gain of Godliness

References

External links

Writings by Watson at the Christian Classics Ethereal Library
Writings at the PuritanLibrary.com and at Monergism.com
The Thomas Watson Reading Room
Sermons by Watson

1620s births
1686 deaths
English Calvinist and Reformed theologians
Ejected English ministers of 1662
Alumni of Emmanuel College, Cambridge
17th-century Calvinist and Reformed theologians